"Falls on Me" is a song by American alternative rock band Fuel. It was released on July 21, 2003, as the second single from their third studio album Natural Selection. It is the second overall single from the album with "Won't Back Down" having been originally released on Daredevil: The Album a few months prior.

"Falls on Me" received moderate airplay on radio and MTV, reaching number 52 on the US Billboard Hot 100 in early 2004. It reached number nine and number 11 on the Mainstream Rock Tracks and the Modern Rock Tracks charts and become a crossover hit, peaking number 13 and number 17 on the Mainstream Top 40 and Adult Top 40 charts. The song was released as a CD single in Australia and peaked at number 56 on the ARIA Singles Chart.

Background and writing
Written by guitarist Carl Bell, the song is about the difficulties of remaining in a monogamous relationship; according to Bell, "Everybody is hardwired to have some wanderlust in them... But that song comes from having a relationship and trying to honor it and not mess up something beautiful."

Track listing
All songs were written by Carl Bell except where noted.

Australian CD single
 "Falls on Me"
 "On the Road Again" 
 "Shimmer"
 "Won't Back Down"

Charts

Release history

References

Fuel (band) songs
2003 singles
Song recordings produced by Michael Beinhorn
Songs written by Carl Bell (musician)
Songs about heartache
Rock ballads